Kokning is the fourth studio album by Norwegian musician Bjørn Torske. It was released in December 2010 under Smalltown Supersound.

Track listing

References

2010 albums
Smalltown Supersound albums